WICU-FM (92.7 MHz) is a contemporary hit radio-formatted radio station in Erie, Pennsylvania, licensed to Lawrence Park, Pennsylvania, under the ownership of SJL Broadcasting (a sister company to Lilly Broadcasting). It uses the moniker "Happi 927". WICU-FM is simulcast in Warren on Lilly-owned WICU (1310 AM and 96.7 FM).

History
The station, using the call sign WEHP, signed on the air November 9, 2012, stunting with songs including the word "Happy"; at 12p.m. on November 16, 2012, it formally launched its contemporary hit radio format under the branding of "Happi 92.7". The station was originally owned by Rick Rambaldo'a Erie Radio Company; the construction permit had been acquired, under the name First Channel Communications, for $2,068,000 in a May 2011 Federal Communications Commission (FCC) auction, outbidding an entity affiliated with Connoisseur Media. Rambaldo had previously a group of Erie radio stations that was sold to NextMedia in 1999, and subsequently acquired by Connoisseur Media and then iHeartMedia. The WEHP call sign was assigned on May 16, 2012.

In September 2019, Erie Radio Company announced the sale of the station to SJL of Pennsylvania, owner of WICU-TV, for $1.33 million; SJL is a sister company to Lilly Broadcasting, whose holdings in the area include WSEE-TV and three Warren radio stations. Under the terms of the agreement, Erie Radio Company retained the rights to the "Happi" brand, but granted SJL/Lilly a perpetual royalty-free license to use the name. The sale was completed on December 31, 2019, at which point the call sign was changed to WICU (the "-FM" suffix was added on February 13, 2020). On April 1, 2020, WICU-FM began simulcasting in Warren on WICU (1310 AM and 96.7 FM).

In September 2021, WICU-FM relocated their studios from its original location at 1229 State Street (13th & State) to 3514 State Street (35th & State) the same building that is the studios for WICU-TV.

References

External links

ICU-FM
Contemporary hit radio stations in the United States
Radio stations established in 2012
2012 establishments in Pennsylvania